The 2010–11 NTFL season was the 90th season of the Northern Territory Football League (NTFL), an Australian rules football competition that was based in the Northern Territory. Eight teams competed in the 2010 season, the same since the 2007 season when the Tiwi Bombers joined the league.

After St Marys took out the minor premiership, the top five teams competed in a final series with second place, Wanderers Eagles winning there 11th premiership title defeating St Marys in the grand final by 18 points.

Ladder

Grand Final

References 

Northern Territory Football League seasons
NTFL